Azlina Arshad (born 26 August 1981) is a Malaysian international lawn bowler.

World Championship 
Arshad has won three World Championship medals; a bronze medal in the fours at the 2008 World Outdoor Bowls Championship in Christchurch, New Zealand, a silver medal in the fours at the 2012 World Outdoor Bowls Championship in Adelaide and in 2016, a bronze medal with Nor Hashimah Ismail and Nur Fidrah Noh in the triples at the 2016 World Outdoor Bowls Championship in Christchurch. In 2020 she was selected for the 2020 World Outdoor Bowls Championship in Australia.

Commonwealth Games 
Azlina won a gold medal at the 2006 Commonwealth Games in the women's triples. Eight years later she competed in both the women's triples and women's fours events at the 2014 Commonwealth Games. She failed to qualify from the group stages in the women's triples event but won a silver medal in the women's fours.

In 2022, she competed in the women's triples and the Women's fours at the 2022 Commonwealth Games. She won the silver medal in the triples with Syafiqa Haidar Afif Abdul Rahman and Nur Ain Nabilah Tarmizi.

Asia Pacific Championships 
Arshad has won eleven Asia Pacific Bowls Championships medals. Included in the haul of medals is four gold medals and a double silver at the 2019 Asia Pacific Bowls Championships in the Gold Coast, Queensland in the triples and fours.

Southeast Asian Games 
Arshad has won three gold medals in the pairs and triples (twice) at the Lawn bowls at the Southeast Asian Games.

Asian Championships
In 2023, she won the triples gold medals at the 14th Asian Lawn Bowls Championship in Kuala Lumpur.

References

External links
  (2010)
  (2014)
 
 
 
 

1981 births
Living people
Malaysian female bowls players
Commonwealth Games medallists in lawn bowls
Commonwealth Games gold medallists for Malaysia
Commonwealth Games silver medallists for Malaysia
Bowls players at the 2002 Commonwealth Games
Bowls players at the 2006 Commonwealth Games
Bowls players at the 2010 Commonwealth Games
Bowls players at the 2014 Commonwealth Games
Bowls players at the 2022 Commonwealth Games
Southeast Asian Games medalists in lawn bowls
Southeast Asian Games gold medalists for Malaysia
Competitors at the 2005 Southeast Asian Games
Competitors at the 2007 Southeast Asian Games
Competitors at the 2017 Southeast Asian Games
Competitors at the 2019 Southeast Asian Games
Southeast Asian Games bronze medalists for Malaysia
Malaysian people of Malay descent
Malaysian Muslims
People from Penang
20th-century Malaysian women
21st-century Malaysian women
Medallists at the 2006 Commonwealth Games
Medallists at the 2014 Commonwealth Games
Medallists at the 2022 Commonwealth Games